Adam Morgan may refer to:

 Adam Morgan (Australian footballer) (born 1981), Australian rules footballer
 Adam Morgan (baseball) (born 1990), baseball player
 Adam Morgan (English footballer) (born 1994), English footballer
 Adam Morgan (Hollyoaks), Hollyoaks character 
 Adam Morgan (racing driver) (born 1988), English racing driver
 Adam Morgan (politician), American politician

See also
 Adams Morgan, neighborhood in Northwest Washington, D.C.